Beauford may refer to:

First name:
Beauford H. Jester
Beauford T. Anderson
Beauford Delaney

Surname:
Carter Beauford
Clayton Beauford

Places
Beauford Township, Blue Earth County, Minnesota, United States
Beauford, Minnesota, an unincorporated community, United States

Other:
 Beauford automobiles
 Beauford (horse)